Full Speed is a 1925 American silent Western film directed by Richard Thorpe and starring Jay Wilsey whose alias was Buffalo Bill Jr.

The film is preserved in the Library of Congress collection.

Cast
 Jay Wilsey (* billed as Buffalo Bill Jr.)
 Mildred Vincent
 Jerome La Grasse
 Lafe McKee
 Lew Meehan
 Slim Whitaker

References

External links
 Full Speed at IMDb.com

1925 films
1925 Western (genre) films
American black-and-white films
Films directed by Richard Thorpe
Silent American Western (genre) films
1920s American films
1920s English-language films